The RAM 03 was an open-wheel Formula One race car, designed, developed and built by British racing team and constructor RAM, to compete in the  and  Formula One world championship.

In 1986 an updated version called 03B was introduced and was driven by New Zealander Mike Thackwell during the pre-season testing for the 1986 season held at Jacarepaguá.

Later in 1986 one of the 03 chassis was converted into a Formula 3000 car, the 04. The car contested a number of races in the 1986 Formula 3000 championship.

References 

RAM Formula One cars